Live at KST, Belgrade 31.05.2003. is a video album by the Serbian rock band Bjesovi, released in 2003.

Track listing 
 "U osvit zadnjeg dana" (3:47)
 "Vraćam se dole" (2:38)
 "Džordžija" (4:10)
 "Ona te voli" (7:10)
 "Vreme je" (5:42)
 "Avioni pevaju" (8:54)
 "Sve što vidim" (6:07)
 "Gavran" (7:41)
 "Sve će se doznati" (3:11)
 "Ne budi me" (5:37)
 "Ime" (5:10)
 "Raduj se" (3:11)

Personnel  
 Marko Marković (bass)
 Miroslav Marjanović (drums, backing vocals)
 Slobodan Vuković (guitar)
 Zoran Filipović (guitar)
 Dragan Arsić (guitar)
 Zoran Marinković (vocals)
 Goran Marić (vocals on track 6)

External links 
 Live at KST, Belgrade 31.05.2003

Bjesovi albums
2003 live albums
2003 video albums
Live video albums